Thomas Mauch (born 4 April 1937) is a German cinematographer and film producer. With a career that spans over fifty years in both film and television, Mauch is well known for his numerous collaborations with Edgar Reitz, Alexander Kluge, and Werner Herzog.

Selected filmography

Awards
 Deutscher Filmpreis - Best Cinematography (1973, 1979, 1989)
 National Society of Film Critics - Best Cinematography (1977)

References

External links
 
 Thomas Mauch at filmportal.de (German)

1937 births
Living people
Film people from Baden-Württemberg
Waldorf school alumni
People from Heidenheim